Kunkush Kancha (Ancash Quechua kunkush Puya raimondii, Quechua kancha enclosure; corral, 'the Puya raimondii field', also spelled Cuncushcancha) is a mountain in the Cordillera Negra in the Andes of Peru which reaches a height of approximately . It is located in the Ancash Region, Huarmey Province, Malvas District, and in the Recuay Province, Cotaparaco District.

References 

Mountains of Peru
Mountains of Ancash Region